Rūjiena is a town in Valmiera Municipality, in the Vidzeme region of Latvia. As of 2017 its population was 3,007.

Geography
The town is located in northern Latvia, near the border with Estonia, in the historical region of Vidzeme (anciently part of Livonia). It is 50 km from Valmiera, 91 from Pärnu and 152 from Riga.

Personalities
 Arturs Alberings, Prime Minister of Latvia from 7 May 1926 to 18 December 1926
 Dāvis Bertāns, basketball player, 1992
 Gustav Klutsis, constructivist photographer and graphic designer
 Moses Wolf Goldberg, chemist, 1905
 Nehemiah Levanon, Israeli official, 1915

Gallery

See also
List of cities in Latvia
Ipiķi parish
Jeri parish
Lode parish
Vilpulka parish
Rujiena Castle

References

External links

 Official website of Rūjiena

 
Towns in Latvia
1920 establishments in Latvia
Castles of the Teutonic Knights
Kreis Wolmar
Valmiera Municipality
Vidzeme